Trummen is a lake in Växjö Municipality, Kronoberg County, Sweden. It is near Teleborg Castle, Linnaeus University, and Sankt Sigfrids Hospital.

Växjö
Trummen